Meredith Charles "Flash" Gourdine (September 26, 1929- November 20, 1998) was an American athlete, engineer and physicist.

Education
Gourdine graduated from Brooklyn Technical High School. He earned a BS in Engineering Physics from Cornell University in 1953, where he was selected for membership in the Quill and Dagger society. In 1960 he earned a Ph.D. in Engineering Physics from the California Institute of Technology while working as a Senior Research Scientist at the Jet Propulsion Laboratory from 1958-60.

Career

Scientific career 
In 1964 Gourdine founded a research and development firm, Gourdine Laboratories, in Livingston, New Jersey. In 1973 he founded Energy Innovations, a company that produced direct-energy conversion devices in Houston, Texas. The companies developed engineering techniques to aid removing smoke from buildings and disperse fog from airport runways, and converting low-grade coal into inexpensive, transportable and high-voltage electrical energy.

Gourdine was inducted to the Dayton, Ohio, Engineering and Science Hall of Fame in 1994. He was elected to the National Academy of Engineering in 1991 and also served as a Trustee of Cornell University. He was an expert in Electrogasdynamics, the generation of electrical energy based on the conversion of the kinetic energy contained in a high-pressure, ionized, moving combustion gas (e.g., Ion wind).  He specialized in devising applications, including electric precipator systems.  He also invented the Focus Flow Heat Sink, used to cool computer chips.

Gourdine was granted a total of over 30 U.S. patents.

Athletic career 
At the 1952 Summer Olympics in Helsinki, while he was still an undergraduate student at Cornell, he won a silver medal for the long jump, one and a half inch short of Jerome Biffle's gold medal jump.

References

External links 
African Americans in the Sciences biography plus NYT obituary
Biography of Gourdine from IEEE
Lemelson biography

American male long jumpers
Olympic silver medalists for the United States in track and field
Athletes (track and field) at the 1952 Summer Olympics
Cornell University College of Engineering alumni
California Institute of Technology alumni
1929 births
1998 deaths
Medalists at the 1952 Summer Olympics
Brooklyn Technical High School alumni
African-American engineers
Engineers from New York (state)
African-American scientists
American scientists
20th-century American engineers
20th-century African-American sportspeople
African-American physicists